Osage County (county code OS) is a county located in the U.S. state of Kansas. As of the 2020 census, the county population was 15,766. Its county seat is Lyndon, and its most populous city is Osage City. The county was originally organized in 1855 as Weller County, and was renamed in 1859 after the Osage Native American Tribe.

History

Early history

For many millennia, the Great Plains of North America was inhabited by nomadic Native Americans.  From the 16th century to 18th century, the Kingdom of France claimed ownership of large parts of North America.  In 1762, after the French and Indian War, France secretly ceded New France to Spain, per the Treaty of Fontainebleau.

19th century
In 1802, Spain returned most of the land to France but keeping title to about 7,500 square miles. In 1803, most of the land for modern day Kansas was acquired by the United States from France as part of the 828,000 square mile Louisiana Purchase for 2.83 cents per acre.

In 1854, the Kansas Territory was organized, then in 1861 Kansas became the 34th U.S. state. In 1859, Osage County was established.

Geography

Adjacent counties
 Shawnee County (north)
 Douglas County (northeast)
 Franklin County (east)
 Coffey County (south)
 Lyon County (southwest)
 Wabaunsee County (northwest)

Demographics

Osage County is included in the Topeka Metropolitan Statistical Area.

As of the 2000 census, there were 16,712 people, 6,490 households, and 4,737 families residing in the county.  The population density was 24 people per square mile (9/km2).  There were 7,018 housing units at an average density of 10 per square mile (4/km2).  The racial makeup of the county was 97.27% White, 0.22% Black or African American, 0.65% Native American, 0.17% Asian, 0.10% Pacific Islander, 0.41% from other races, and 1.18% from two or more races.  Hispanic or Latino of any race were 1.53% of the population.

There were 6,490 households, out of which 33.80% had children under the age of 18 living with them, 61.00% were married couples living together, 8.10% had a female householder with no husband present, and 27.00% were non-families. 23.50% of all households were made up of individuals, and 11.50% had someone living alone who was 65 years of age or older.  The average household size was 2.54 and the average family size was 2.99.

In the county, the population was spread out, with 27.00% under the age of 18, 6.40% from 18 to 24, 27.00% from 25 to 44, 23.70% from 45 to 64, and 15.80% who were 65 years of age or older.  The median age was 39 years. For every 100 females, there were 96.00 males.  For every 100 females age 18 and over, there were 93.30 males.

The median income for a household in the county was $37,928, and the median income for a family was $44,581. Males had a median income of $30,670 versus $22,981 for females. The per capita income for the county was $17,691.  About 6.40% of families and 8.40% of the population were below the poverty line, including 8.40% of those under age 18 and 10.40% of those age 65 or over.

Government

Presidential elections
Osage County is strongly Republican. In only six presidential elections from 1880 to the present day has the county failed to back the Republican Party candidate, most recently in Lyndon B. Johnson's national landslide of 1964.

Laws
Osage County was a prohibition, or "dry", county until the Kansas Constitution was amended in 1986 and voters approved the sale of alcoholic liquor by the individual drink with a 30% food sales requirement.

The county voted "No" on the 2022 Kansas Value Them Both Amendment, an anti-abortion ballot measure, by 56% to 44% despite backing Donald Trump with 71% of the vote to Joe Biden's 27% in the 2020 presidential election.

Education

Unified school districts
 Osage City USD 420
 Lyndon USD 421 
 Santa Fe Trail USD 434 
 Burlingame USD 454 
 Marais des Cygnes Valley USD 456

Media
Osage County is served by a weekly newspaper, The Osage County Herald-Chronicle. The newspaper has a circulation of approximately 4,500, making it the 3rd largest paid weekly publication in the state of Kansas.

The Herald-Chronicle was created by the merger of The Osage County Herald and The Osage County Chronicle in February 2007.

Communities

Cities

 Burlingame
 Carbondale
 Lyndon
 Melvern
 Olivet
 Osage City
 Overbrook
 Quenemo
 Scranton

Census-designated place
Vassar

Other unincorporated communities
 Barclay
 Michigan Valley

Townships
Osage County is divided into sixteen townships.  The city of Osage City is considered governmentally independent and is excluded from the census figures for the townships.  In the following table, the population center is the largest city (or cities) included in that township's population total, if it is of a significant size.

See also
 National Register of Historic Places listings in Osage County, Kansas
Osage State Fishing Lake

References

Further reading

 Standard Atlas of Osage County, Kansas; Geo. A. Ogle & Co; 80 pages; 1918.
 Descriptive Atlas of Osage County, Kansas; Geo. A. Ogle & Co; 67 pages; 1899.
 An Illustrated Historical Atlas of Osage County, Kansas; Geo. A. Ogle & Co; 46 pages; 1879.

External links

County
 
 Osage County - Directory of Public Officials
Other
 Osage County Historical Society
Maps
 Osage County Maps: Current, Historic, KDOT
 Kansas Highway Maps: Current, Historic, KDOT
 Kansas Railroad Maps: Current, 1996, 1915, KDOT and Kansas Historical Society

 
Kansas counties
Kansas placenames of Native American origin
1859 establishments in Kansas Territory
Topeka metropolitan area, Kansas